Pamela Hakongaq Gross, usually known as Pam Gross is a Canadian Inuk politician, who was elected to the Legislative Assembly of Nunavut in the 2021 Nunavut general election. She represents the electoral district of Cambridge Bay. In 2021, she became the deputy premier of Nunavut.

References

External links
 The Honourable Pamela Hakongak Gross profile at the Legislative Assembly of Nunavut

Living people
Members of the Legislative Assembly of Nunavut
Women MLAs in Nunavut
Inuit politicians
21st-century Canadian politicians
21st-century Canadian women politicians
Inuit from Nunavut
People from Cambridge Bay
Year of birth missing (living people)